Edmond Delathouwer (26 May 1916 - 26 August 1994) was a professional road bicycle racer from Belgium. Delathouwer won the classic La Flèche Wallonne in 1939.

Major results 

1938
 2nd, Gent–Wevelgem
1939
 1st, La Flèche Wallonne
 13th, Liège–Bastogne–Liège
 Tour de France
 3rd, Stage 3
 4th, Stage 1

External links

1916 births
Belgian male cyclists
1994 deaths
Cyclists from Antwerp Province
People from Boom, Belgium